Natalia Madaj (born 25 January 1988) is a Polish rower. At the 2012 Summer Olympics, she finished 8th in the women's quadruple sculls. At 2016 Summer Olympics Madaj won her first gold medal in women's double sculls, competing in partnership with Magdalena Fularczyk.

See also
 Poland at the 2016 Summer Olympics

References

Polish female rowers
1988 births
Living people
Olympic rowers of Poland
Rowers at the 2012 Summer Olympics
Rowers at the 2016 Summer Olympics
People from Piła
Sportspeople from Greater Poland Voivodeship
World Rowing Championships medalists for Poland
Olympic gold medalists for Poland
Olympic medalists in rowing
Medalists at the 2016 Summer Olympics
European Rowing Championships medalists